The 3rd Kentucky Infantry Regiment was a volunteer infantry regiment that served in the Confederate States Army during the American Civil War. It was part of the First Kentucky Brigade through August 1862.

Service
The 3rd Kentucky Infantry was organized in July 1861, at Camp Boone in Montgomery, Tennessee, under the command of Colonel Lloyd Tilghman.

At the Battle of Shiloh, the regiment was brigaded with the 4th Alabama Infantry, 31st Alabama Infantry, 4th Kentucky Infantry, 6th Kentucky Infantry, and 9th Kentucky Infantry. In a charge on the Union Army lines, 174 men from the 3rd Kentucky Infantry were killed. All regimental officers were either killed or wounded.

The regiment remained at Port Hudson, Louisiana, until August 20, 1862, when it was ordered to Jackson, Mississippi.  Major General John C. Breckinridge was ordered to take the 4th Kentucky Infantry, 6th Kentucky Infantry, and 9th Kentucky Infantry with him and report to General Braxton Bragg. The 3rd Kentucky Infantry, 7th Kentucky Infantry, and 8th Kentucky Infantry became part of the Army of Tennessee and returned to Port Hudson. The 3rd Kentucky Infantry were en route to Bragg at Tullahoma, Tennessee, when they were ordered to reinforce Lieutenant General John C. Pemberton in the defenses of Vicksburg, Mississippi.

By 1864, the regiment's strength was severely depleted. The 3rd Kentucky Infantry was ordered to report to General Nathan Bedford Forrest. Horses were unavailable, so the men followed Forrest on foot. The Kentucky troops that accompanied Forrest were divided into four brigades. The 3rd Kentucky Infantry was in the third brigade with the 7th Kentucky Infantry, and 8th Kentucky Infantry, commanded by Colonel A. P. Thompson. On March 15, 1864 Forrest moved north toward Paducah, Kentucky. Three miles from Paducah they encountered Union pickets and pushed them back to their camp on the outskirts of town. Under fire from a nearby fort, the Kentuckians moved through the streets of Paducah. The fort was discovered to be impenetrable, and a retreat was ordered.  Thompson was killed by cannon fire while leading his troops. Forrest soon returned to Mississippi where the regiment was engaged at the Battle of Brice's Crossroads. At some point in the campaign to Kentucky, the regiment was mounted, becoming the 3rd Kentucky Mounted Infantry.

The regiment participated in the Battle of Franklin and surrendered on May 6, 1865, at Columbus, Mississippi.

Commanders
 Colonel Lloyd Tilghman - promoted to brigadier general
 Colonel Albert P. Thompson

See also

 List of Kentucky Civil War Confederate units
 Kentucky in the Civil War

References
 Carvell, Frank R., Jr. The Kentucky Brave: A Study of the Activities of the 12th Tennessee Infantry, 22nd Tennessee Infantry, 3rd Kentucky Infantry and 7th Kentucky Infantry, 1861-1862 (Paducah, KY: S.B.C. Pub.), 1999.
 George, Henry. History of the 3d, 7th, 8th and 12th Kentucky C.S.A. (Louisville, KY: C. T. Dearing), 1911.
 Thompson, Edwin Porter. History of the First Kentucky Brigade (Cincinnati, OH: Caxton Pub. House), 1868.
 Thompson, Edwin Porter. History of the Orphan Brigade (Louisville, KY: L. N. Thompson), 1898.

External links
 3rd Kentucky Infantry living history organization

Military units and formations established in 1861
Military units and formations disestablished in 1865
Units and formations of the Confederate States Army from Kentucky
Orphan Brigade
1861 establishments in Tennessee